Jerametrius Tarell Butler (born November 28, 1978) is a former American football cornerback in the National Football League.  He was drafted by the St. Louis Rams in the fifth round of the 2001 NFL Draft.  He played college football at Kansas State.

Butler was also a member of the Washington Redskins, Buffalo Bills and New Orleans Saints. He retired prior to the 2008 season.

College career
After a high school career at Carter High School in Dallas, Texas, Butler committed to play cornerback at Kansas State.  He played from 1998 to 2000, which included 10 interceptions, 6 of which came in 2000, leading him to earn first-team All-Big 12 honors.

Professional career

Pre-draft

St. Louis Rams
Butler was drafted in the fifth round with the 145th overall pick.  On June 26, 2001, Butler signed a three-year $1.01 million contract with the Rams. Butler played his first six professional seasons with the St. Louis Rams. Jerametrius Butler earned the starting left cornerback job for 2003 season. Leading the Rams in interception and pass break ups. He also finished sixth on the team in tackles. On March 6, 2004, Butler, a now a restricted free agent, signed a six-year, $15 million offer sheet with Washington. On March 11, 2004, the Rams opted to match the Washington offer. In 2004, he had five interceptions leading the team again while giving up only one touchdown. Butler finished the season ranked fourth on the team in tackles. With 82. He  suffered a season-ending knee injury (PCL) n training camp in 2005, causing him to miss the entire 2005 season. He was released by the Rams on June 5, 2007.

Washington Redskins
Butler signed with the Washington Redskins on June 7, 2007, but was released on August 28.

Buffalo Bills
Butler was signed by the Buffalo Bills as an unrestricted free agent on September 25, 2007. It was a two-year one million dollar contract. After being sidelined with a leg injury for the last four games On February 27, 2008, the Bills released him.

New Orleans Saints
Butler signed with the Saints on June 2, 2008. However, on July 23, he opted to retire. The Saints terminated his contract on February 12, 2009.

Personal life
Butler's son, Jerametrius Butler, Jr., is a freshman on the Tarleton State Texans football team in Stephenville, Texas.

References

1978 births
Living people
People from Le Sueur County, Minnesota
Players of American football from Mississippi
American football cornerbacks
Kansas State Wildcats football players
St. Louis Rams players
Washington Redskins players
Buffalo Bills players
New Orleans Saints players
People from Cleveland, Mississippi